Adulfus of Dummium (?-?) was a medieval Galician bishop.

References 
 Episcopologio Mindoniense. CAL PARDO, Enrique, 2003, .

External links 

  Official web site of the Diocese of Mondoñedo-Ferrol

11th-century Galician bishops